Tyssem is a pop-hip hop French singer and songwriter. She was born in Paris in 1984 and grew up in the south of France, around Toulouse. She later moved back to Paris to pursue her musical career.

Biography
Tyssem's parents separated when she was 4 years old. Her mother died when she was 10 years old. The death profoundly marked her, and she started writing music to help her cope with the pain. She discovered a love for the great singers while spending time at her mother's discothèque.

She knew at 13 years old that she wanted to be a professional singer. Her family encouraged her to finish her studies before pursuing her dream. She tried several styles of music, joining rock and rap groups before deciding to try a solo career.

Her first album, Une Bombe à la place du Cœur, was released in January 2008 by Polydor/Universal. Her first single from the album was "Regarde."

She can be heard on the French remix of "The Way I Are" by Timbaland and on the French remix of "Takin' Back My Love" by Enrique Iglesias.

Sources

 Tyssem's Official MySpace
 Tyssem at Musique.com
 Tyssem's biography at ados.fr
 Brief article on AOL Music France

French people of Kabyle descent
Musicians from Paris
1984 births
Living people
Kabyle people
Tyssem
21st-century French singers
21st-century French women singers